The Chess World Cup 2011 was a chess World Cup tournament. It was a 128-player single-elimination tournament, played between 26 August and 21 September 2011, in Khanty-Mansiysk, Russia. The Cup winner Peter Svidler, along with second placed Alexander Grischuk and third placed Vassily Ivanchuk, qualified for the Candidates stage of the World Chess Championship 2013.

Format
Matches consisted of two games (except for the final, which consisted of four).  Players had 90 minutes for the first 40 moves followed by 30 minutes for the rest of the game with an addition of 30 seconds per move from move one. If the match was tied after the regular games, tie breaks were played on the next day. The format for the tie breaks was as follows:
 Two rapid games (25 minutes plus 10 second increment) were played. 
 If the score was still tied, two rapid games (10 minutes plus 10 second increment) were played.
 If these two games were drawn, the opponents played two blitz-games (5 minutes plus 3 second increment).
 If the score was still tied after pair of blitz games, a single armageddon game (white must win, black only needs to draw) would be played. White had 5 minutes, black had 4 minutes, and both players had three-second increments beginning with move 61. Eventually, two Armageddon game were played in round 1 and round 3.

In the final the regulation is the same with the exception that instead of two games with "long" time control the finalists are to play four. Those who lost in the semifinal round played an additional match (according to the same regulation as in the final) for third place and the right to participate in the Candidates. The first two "tickets" to the Candidates are given to the finalists.

Participants
The winner of the Chess World Cup 2009, Boris Gelfand, did not participate. As the winner of the 2011 Candidates, he was an automatic qualifier for the 2013 Candidates.

The players qualified for the event were:

 , 2788 (WC)
 , 2768 (R)
 , 2765 (R)
 , 2764 (WC)
 , 2760 (R)
 , 2746 (R)
 , 2744 (R)
 , 2741 (R)
 , 2739 (R)
 , 2736 (R)
 , 2733 (R)
 , 2726 (E10)
 , 2724 (R)
 , 2722 (R)
 , 2722 (J09)
 , 2719 (R)
 , 2718 (R)
 , 2717 (R)
 , 2715 (E11)
 , 2715 (AS10)
 , 2715 (R)
 , 2714 (R)
 , 2713 (E10)
 , 2711 (R)
 , 2711 (E10)
 , 2710 (R)
 , 2709 (R)
 , 2707 (E10)
 , 2706 (E10)
 , 2706 (WC)
 , 2700 (PN)
 , 2700 (E10)
 , 2699 (E11)
 , 2698 (R)
 , 2697 (R)
 , 2696 (E10)
 , 2696 (J10)
 , 2694 (R)
 , 2689 (E11)
 , 2688 (E11)
 , 2685 (E11)
 , 2683 (E11)
 , 2682 (E10)
 , 2681 (PN)
 , 2680 (E10)
 , 2679 (E11)
 , 2679 (E10)
 , 2679 (E11)
 , 2678 (PN)
 , 2675 (Z3.5)
 , 2675 (Z2.1)
 , 2673 (Z2.3)
 , 2672 (AS11)
 , 2671 (E11)
 , 2669 (AS11)
 , 2669 (Z3.5)
 , 2669 (PN)
 , 2667 (E10)
 , 2666 (E11)
 , 2665 (E10)
 , 2662 (AS10)
 , 2659 (E11)
 , 2659 (E10)
 , 2658 (AS10)
 , 2654 (PN)
 , 2651 (E11)
 , 2650 (E11)
 , 2649 (E11)
 , 2648 (E11)
 , 2646 (E11)
 , 2642 (Z3.7)
 , 2641 (E10)
 , 2637 (AS11)
 , 2637 (E10)
 , 2636 (AS10)
 , 2636 (E11)
 , 2635 (AM11)
 , 2633 (E11)
 , 2631 (AF)
 , 2631 (E10)
 , 2629 (E10)
 , 2627 (AS10)
 , 2626 (E10)
 , 2624 (E11)
 , 2618 (E11)
 , 2617 (Z2.1)
 , 2616 (E10)
 , 2614 (E10)
 , 2611 (AM11)
 , 2606 (Z3.4)
 , 2600 (E10)
 , 2597 (Z3.4)
 , 2597 (Z2.5)
 , 2590 (E11)
 , 2589 (AS11)
 , 2585 (AM11)
 , 2575 (WWC)
 , 2574 (E10)
 , 2573 (Z2.5)
 , 2572 (E10)
 , 2570 (Z3.6)
 , 2566 (Z2.4)
 , 2560 (Z2.1)
 , 2556, IM (AM11)
 , 2550 (ON)
 , 2549 (E11)
 , 2548 (Z2.3)
 , 2545 (Z3.3)
 , 2544 (Z3.3)
 , 2543 (E11)
 , 2539 (Z2.1)
 , 2538 (Z2.1)
 , 2532 (PN)
 , 2528 (Z3.2)
 , 2520 (ON)
 , 2514 (AM11)
 , 2510 (AF)
 , 2503 (ON)
 , 2493 (Z3.1)
 , 2493 (AM10)
 , 2480, IM (Z2.4)
 , 2477 (AM11)
 , 2452, IM (ON)
 , 2449, IM (Z2.2)
 , 2434, IM (Z4.3)
 , 2402, no title (Z4.2)
 , 2362, FM (AF)
 , 2344, IM (Z4.1)

1 Wang Hao and Vladimir Akopian did not appear for their first round matches and lost on forfeit.

All players are grandmasters unless indicated otherwise. 

Qualification paths:

WC: Finalist and Semi-finalists of Chess World Cup 2009
WWC: Women's World Champion
J09 and J10: World Junior Champions 2009 and 2010
R: Rating (average of July 2010 and January 2011 ratings is used)
E10 and E11: European Individual Championships 2010 and 2011
AM10: Pan American Continental Absolute Championship 2010

AM11: American Continental Chess Championship 2011
AS10 and AS11: Asian Chess Championship 2010 and 2011
AF: African Chess Championship 2011
Z2.1, Z2.2, Z2.3, Z2.4, Z2.5, Z3.1, Z3.2, Z3.3, Z3.4, Z3.5, Z3.6, Z3.7, Z4.1, Z4.2, Z4.3: Zonal tournaments
PN: FIDE president nominee
ON: Organizer nominee

Calendar

Results, rounds 1–4

Section 1

Section 2

Section 3

Section 4

Section 5

Section 6

Section 7

Section 8

Results, rounds 5–7

Third place, 16–20 September

Final, 16–20 September

References

External links

2011
World Cup
World Cup
Sport in Khanty-Mansiysk
2011 in Russian sport
International sports competitions hosted by Russia